Bomdila is the headquarters of West Kameng district in the state of Arunachal Pradesh in India. Bomdila is one of the 60 constituencies of the state of Arunachal Pradesh.

Geography and Climate
It has an average elevation of 2415 metres (7923 feet).

Climate: In Bomdila, the wet season is cool and mostly cloudy and the dry season is cold and clear. Over the course of the year, the temperature typically varies from 31 °F to 66 °F and is rarely below 27 °F or above 70 °F.

Demographics
 India census, Bomdila had a population of 6685. Males constitute 54% of the population and females 46%. Bomdila has an average literacy rate of 69%, higher than the national average of 59.5%; with male literacy of 75% and female literacy of 63%. 13% of the population is under 6 years of age. It is inhabited by the Monpa, Sherdukpen, Miji, Bugun (Khowa) and Aka tribes.

Languages

According to Census 2011, Bhotia is Spoken by 2,479 people, Nepali is Spoken by 1,670 people, Hindi at 519 people, Bengali language by 511, Assamese by 508 people, Monpa by 492  people, Nishi by 337 people and Bhojpuri at 224.

Transport 
Despite its rough roads and tough climatic conditions, Bomdila is well connected with Guwahati (320 km), Tawang (167 km), and Tezpur (162 km). Although one should be aware of the landslides while traveling by road. The nearest airport is in Tezpur (Assam) where buses and cabs can be easily availed. The closest railway station is Rangapara Railway station (Assam) which is around 145 km away from Bomdila.

Features 

The Eaglenest Wildlife Sanctuary is near Bomdila.
Tourism has become a big source of income in Bomdila because of infrastructure developments. Many new hotels and homestays have come up. It has become a halt station for tourists traveling to Tawang.
Much of the food here is local cuisine but one can get North Indian food on order.
The Bomdila pass offers views of Kangto and Gorichen Peaks, the highest in the state. GRL Buddhist Monastery, Buddha Park, Guru Rinpoche statue are must-visit places. One can go to the New Bomdila helipad and enjoy the view of the whole town. Around the town, apple orchards and orchid farms are places of interest for many people. The historical 17th-century Lhagyala Monastery at Morshing village (70 km from Bomdila).

Media
Bomdila has an All India Radio Relay station known as Akashvani Bomdila. It broadcasts on FM frequencies.

References

External links

West Kameng district
Cities and towns in West Kameng district